Headlee is a surname. Notable people with the name include:
Celeste Headlee (born 1969), journalist
Richard Headlee (1930–2004)
Russell Headlee (1908–1987), member of the Pennsylvania House of Representatives (1951–1968)

See also
Headlee, Indiana
Hedley (surname)
Headley (surname)